The Institute for Slavic Studies of the Russian Academy of Sciences (Russian: Институт славяноведения РАН) is an integral part of the Historical and Philological Studies Department of the Russian Academy of Sciences. It is a unique Russian academic institution focused on comprehensive studies of Slavic history, culture, literature, and languages. The Institute carries on the traditions of Russian Slavic scholars that have evolved over the last two centuries.

History 
The Institute was founded in 1947 as the Institute for Slavic and Balcan Studies of the Academy of Sciences of the USSR. Since 1997, the Institute has its current name. Amongst the researchers of the Institute were Academicians of the RAS: Yulian Bromley, Nikolay Derzhavin, Boris Grekov, Gennady Litavrin, Dmitry Markov, Leonid Milov, Sergey Obnorsky, Vladimir Picheta, Yury Pisarev, Mikhail Tikhomirov, Nikita Tolstoy, Vladimir Toporov, and Oleg Trubachyov; Corresponding Members of the RAS: Tatiana Nikolaeva, Petr Tretyakov, Zinaida Udaltsova, and Vladimir Volkov. Currently, there are Academicians of the RAS: Vladimir Dybo, Vyacheslav Ivanov, and Andrey A. Zaliznyak; Foreign Member of the Serbian Academy of Sciences and Arts Anatolij A. Turilov; and Corresponding Members of the RAS: Aleksey Gippius and Boris Floria.

The principal lines of research at the Institute are as follows:

 Historico-cultural and ethnic studies of the Slavs and their neighbors; ethnogenesis of the Slavs;
 Research into and maintenance of cultural traditions; Slavic booklore; archival heritage of Slavic scholars; history of Slavic studies;
 Tradition and modernization; social and national movements; foreign affairs and military conflicts in Central, Eastern, and South Eastern Europe;
 Reception of Russian culture by Slavic cultures and reception of Slavic cultures by Russia;
 Comparative study of Slavic culture, literature, and folklore;
 Typological, contrastive, and comparative study of Ancient and Modern Slavic, Balkan, and Baltic languages and dialects; ethnolinguistics.

Academic journals, yearbooks, and periodicals 
The Institute for Slavic Studies publishes several academic journals and periodicals:

Slavianovedenie

Slavianovedenie (Russian: Славяноведение, ISSN 0132-1366) is an academic journal published six times a year since 1965 (before 1992, Sovetskoe Slavianovedenie). Issues of the journal since 1965 till 2009 are available free on the website of the Institute.

Slověne

Slověne = Словѣне. International Journal of Slavic Studies (pISSN 2304-0785, eISSN 2305-6754) is a biannual peer-reviewed open-access academic journal since 2012.

Slavic Almanac (Russian: Славянский альманах, ISSN 2073-5731) is published since 1997.

Slavic World in the Third Millennium (Russian: Славянский мир в третьем тысячелетии) is a yearbook published since 2006.

Archaeographic Yearbook (Russian: Археографический ежегодник) has been published since 1957 by the Archaeographic Commission.

Other yearbooks and periodicals 
 The Slavic Linguistic Atlas (Russian: Общеславянский лингвистический атлас)
 Khazarian Almanac (Russian: Хазарский альманах)
 The Library of the Institute for Slavic Studies (Russian: Библиотека Института славяноведения РАН)
 Belarus and Ukraine: History and Culture (Russian: Белоруссия и Украина: история и культура)
 Studies in Slavic Dialectology (Russian: Исследования по славянской диалектологии)

References

External links 
  

Organizations based in Moscow
Research institutes in Russia
Organizations established in 1947
Slavic studies
Research institutes in the Soviet Union
Institutes of the Russian Academy of Sciences
Balkan studies